The Hyundai HCD-11 Nuvis Concept is a concept car designed at the company's California Design Center in Irvine, California.  The vehicle was unveiled in the 2009 New York Auto Show.

Design
The design concept was inspired by the interplay of natural, fluid elements with more rigid surfaces and structures to create the illusion of constant motion.

One of its more unusual features is its upwards-opening doors, which are especially rare on SUVs. It is also a hybrid vehicle.

Specifications
The concept's features include 22-inch wheels and gullwing doors.

Interior seating fabric was provided by True Textiles, which was made from 100 percent post-consumer recycled polyester – reclaimed soda bottles – and increasingly sustainable manufacturing processes. Matching seatbelts are provided by Harveys Original Seatbeltbags.

The vehicle was powered by a parallel hybrid system, featuring 2.4-liter Theta II engine and a  electric motor with total rating of 228 hp (estimated), 6-speed automatic transmission, 270 Volt/5.3Ah lithium polymer battery pack.

Marketing
Harveys Original Seatbeltbags also developed two matching handbags for the Nuvis concept.

References

External links

Hyundai HCD-11 Nuvis Concept page
Hyundai Nuvis Concept

Crossover sport utility vehicles
Nuvis
Automobiles with gull-wing doors